Young In Hong (born 1972) is a visual artist from Seoul, Korea, based in Bristol, England. Hong graduated with an MA and a PhD in Art from Goldsmith College in London UK in 2012. From 1992 to 1998, she studied Sculpture at Seoul National University (BA and MA). Hong currently works from her studio at Spike Island in Bristol and is represented by PKM Gallery in Seoul. She teaches at Bath School of Art as Reader in Performance and Textiles.

Practice 
Hong's work is research-led, revisiting specific historical moments in South Korea and reinterpreting them. She is interested in how art can have a political role, particularly from a female perspective, as South Korean history has evolved under authoritative male-dominated regimes until very recently. In her practice, Hong examines unwritten history, collective memory and undervalued cultural practices, politics of intuition and the practice of ‘equality’. Most of her works deal with those people whom society regards as minorities, and she often uses methods that are not usually associated with high art. Hong works in a range of disciplines – drawing, embroidery painting, installation and site-specific performance. For her performance projects, she collaborates with local communities, dancers, musicians and choreographers and the public. 

In 2015, curator Fatoş Üstek commissioned her to create a new work for fig-2 at the ICA London, resulting in the ambitious, very complex, but at the same time very strong and resonating piece In Her Dream, a collaboration with Delfina Foundation and The Korean Cultural Centre. Hong combined baroque aesthetics with Korean Shaman music for a performance based on a detailed study of induced violence and isolation in the everyday lives of women from various countries of affiliation. 

The Moon's Trick, Hong's solo exhibition at the Korean Cultural Centre UK in 2017 was part of Korea-UK/2017-18. It later travelled to Exeter Phoenix. The same year, Echoes, commissioned by Venice Agendas, launched at the Venice Biennale in May 2017 and continued to run in Margate at Turner Contemporary, Folkestone and Spike Island Bristol in December 2017. Voluntary participants were invited through open call to respond to a soundtrack consisting of a compilation of political statements by public figures ranging from Donald Trump to Michael Moore.    

In her solo show We Where at PKM Gallery in Seoul in 2022, "Hong attends to the subject of “communities” that become forgotten in contemporary society. She recognizes the loss of a communal space that premodern folks believed to be real, i.e., sacred areas in which the spirits of living organisms including animals, humans, and plants could communicate through a natural connection, and wishes for the recovery of such relationships of equality." For the group exhibition Scoring the Word, Hong created Meta-hierarchical Exercise, a series of nine improvised group performances with 24 embroidered choreography-scores, presented at the Seoul Museum of Art in November 2022.

5100:Pentagon, created for the Gwangju Biennale 2014, was performed again at the Parque de la Memoria in Buenos Aires in December 2022, with local volunteers, as part of Mitos del futuro próximo curated by Sofía Dourron and Javier Villa. The movements of the performers are inspired by video footage of the Gwangju massacre in South Korea in May 1980, found in the archives of the democratic movement in the city of Gwangju.

Lubaina Himid included Hong's embroidered image Burning Love in the touring exhibition Found Cities, Lost Objects: Women in the City, curated in partnership with the Arts Council Collection in 2022/23.

Ring of Animals, Young In Hong's first solo exhibition in Belgium is shown at Kunsthal Extra City in Antwerp in early 2023.

Artists' Residencies 

 2015: Seoul Art Space Geumcheon, Seoul
 2014 + 2015: Delfina Foundation, London
 2014: ARKO Nomadic Artist in Residence, Chennai, India
 2009: Art In Village, Sabuk-Gohan, Korea
 2005: A-I-T Residency Program, Tokyo
 2004: Ssamzie Residency Program, Seoul
 2002: Taipei Artist Village, Taipei
 1996: Vermont Studio Center, Johnson, U.S.

Awards 

 2019: Korea Artist Prize 2019 (shortlist)
 2012: SINAP (Sindoh Artist Support Program), Korea
 2011: Kimsechoong Art Prize, Seoul
 2003: Suk-Nam Art Prize, Suk-Nam Art Foundation, Seoul

Exhibitions/Performances 

 2023: Ring of Animals, Kunsthal Extra City, Antwerp
 2023: Found Cities, Lost Objects: Women in the City, Southampton City Art Gallery
 2023: Found Cities, Lost Objects: Women in the City, Royal West of England Gallery, Bristol
 2022: Found Cities, Lost Objects: Women in the City, touring exhibition, curated by Lubaina Himid in partnership with the Arts Council Collection, Birmingham Museum & Art Gallery
 2022/23: Whose Story Is This, Museum of Contemporary Art Busan
 2022/23: Myths of the near future, Parque de la Memoria, Buenos Aires 
 2022: Scoring the Words, Seoul Museum of Art, Seoul Korea 
 2022: We Where, PKM Gallery Seoul (solo)
 2021: Our Rhythms Have Been Out of Sync in The Past, DMZ Art & Peace Platform 2021, Goseong Korea
2020: MaytoDay project, Gwangju Biennale
2020: Go On Being So, Newlyn Art Gallery
2020: Korean Eye 2020: Creativity and Daydream, Lotte World Tower Mall Seoul
2020: Korean Eye 2020: Creativity and Daydream, Saatchi Gallery London
 2020: Korean Eye 2020: Creativity and Daydream, The State Hermitage Museum Saint Petersburg
 2019/20: Korea Art Prize, National Museum of Modern and Contemporary Art, Seoul (MMCA) 
2019: Let Us Dance, Arnolfini, Bristol UK
2018: The Moon’s Trick, Exeter Phoenix
 2017: Turner Contemporary, Margate
 2017: 5100: Pentagon, UK premiere, Royal Academy of Arts London, as part of Block Universe
 2017: The Moon's Trick, Korean Cultural Centre, London
 2017: Echoes 2017, Venice Biennial
 2016: La Triennale di Milano
 2016: Grand Palais, Paris 
 2016: A Fire that Never Dies, Cecilia Hillström Gallery, Stockholm
 2015/16: [ana] please keep your eyes closed for a moment, Maraya Art Centre, Sharjah
2015: In Her Dream, fig-2 6/50, ICA Institute of Contemporary Arts London
 2014: Image Unidentified, Artsonje Centre, Seoul
 2014: Gwangju Biennale
 2014: Delfina Foundation, London

Collections 
Arts Council Collection

Gyeonggi Museum of Modern Art, Korea

Seoul Museum of Art

References

External links 
Young In Hong's artist website

1972 births
Living people
21st-century women textile artists
21st-century textile artists
Alumni of Goldsmiths, University of London
Artists from Seoul
Performance artists
Seoul National University alumni
South Korean contemporary artists
Embroiderers